Pablo Aitor Bernal Rosique (born August 25, 1986) is a Spanish track cyclist. At the 2012 Summer Olympics, he competed in the Men's team pursuit for the national team. He was born in Alhama de Murcia.

References

External links
 

Spanish male cyclists
1986 births
Living people
Olympic cyclists of Spain
Cyclists at the 2012 Summer Olympics
Spanish track cyclists
People from Bajo Guadalentín
Cyclists from the Region of Murcia